KMOR (93.3 FM) is a radio station broadcasting a classic rock format. Licensed to Gering, Nebraska, United States, it serves the Scottsbluff, Nebraska area.  The station is currently operated by the Nebraska Rural Radio Association.

On August 27, 2007, KMOR's classic rock format moved from 101.3 FM in Bridgeport, Nebraska to 93.3 FM in Gering, Nebraska.

Ownership
In May 2013, Armada Media and Legacy Broadcasting traded some stations in Nebraska, with two stations in Holdrege (KUVR/1380 and KMTY/97.7) going to Legacy and eight others in the Scottsbluff and North Platte markets [KZTL/93.5 (Paxton-North Platte) and KRNP/100.7 (Sutherland-North Platte)  KOAQ/690 (Terrytown), KOLT/1320 (Scottsbluff), KMOR/93.3 (Gering), KETT/99.3 (Mitchell), KOZY-FM/101.3 (Bridgeport), KHYY/106.9 (Minatare)] going to Armada Media.  A purchase price was not announced.
The station was eventually purchased by the Nebraska Rural Radio Association.

References

External links
Official Website

MOR
Radio stations established in 1980